Piskorze may refer to the following places in Poland:
Piskorze, Lower Silesian Voivodeship (south-west Poland)
Piskorze, Warmian-Masurian Voivodeship (north Poland)